Trey Britton (born June 1, 1989) is an American professional basketball player.

Professional career
He started his career with Aanekosken Huima, in the Finnish second division in 2011–12.

In the 2013–14 season, he played in the Japanese bj league with Gunma CraneThunders.

In the 2014–15 season, Britton was a member of Omonia. Britton was the leading rebounder of the Cypriotic League, averaging 10.2 rebounds per game.

The Basketball Tournament
In 2017, Britton participated in The Basketball Tournament for team Showtime. The team was eliminated in the first round. The Basketball Tournament is an annual $2 million winner-take-all tournament broadcast on ESPN.

References

External links
RealGM profile

1989 births
Living people
American expatriate basketball people in Cyprus
American expatriate basketball people in Finland
American expatriate basketball people in France
American expatriate basketball people in Georgia (country)
American expatriate basketball people in Japan
American men's basketball players
Anderson Trojans men's basketball players
Basketball players from Georgia (U.S. state)
Centers (basketball)
Gunma Crane Thunders players
People from Alpharetta, Georgia
Sportspeople from Fulton County, Georgia
UJAP Quimper 29 players